Mutatocoptops anancyloides is a species of beetle in the family Cerambycidae. It was described by Bernhard Schwarzer in 1925, originally under the genus Coptops. It is known from Taiwan and Laos.

References

Mesosini
Beetles described in 1925